Bécc mac Airemóin (died 893) or Bécc mac Éiremóin was a Dál Fiatach king of Ulaid, which is now Ulster, Ireland. He was the son of Airemón mac Áedo (died 886), a previous king of Ulaid. He ruled from 886 to 893.

He became king of Ulaid upon the assassination of his cousin, Fiachnae mac Ainbítha in 886. He was slain in 893 by Aitíth mac Laigni (died 898) of the Uí Echach Cobo.

Notes

References 

Byrne, Francis John (2001), Irish Kings and High-Kings, Dublin: Four Courts Press,

External links
CELT: Corpus of Electronic Texts at University College Cork

Kings of Ulster
9th-century Irish monarchs
893 deaths
Year of birth unknown